Quanta Magazine is an editorially independent online publication of the Simons Foundation covering developments in physics, mathematics, biology and computer science.

Undark Magazine described Quanta Magazine as "highly regarded for its masterful coverage of complex topics in science and math." The science news aggregator RealClearScience ranked Quanta Magazine first on its list of "The Top 10 Websites for Science in 2018." In 2020, the magazine received a National Magazine Award for General Excellence from the American Society of Magazine Editors for its "willingness to tackle some of the toughest and most difficult topics in science and math in a language that is accessible to the lay reader without condescension or oversimplification."

The articles in the magazine are freely available to read online. Scientific American, Wired, The Atlantic, and The Washington Post, as well as international science publications like Spektrum der Wissenschaft, have reprinted articles from the magazine.

History
Quanta Magazine was initially launched as Simons Science News in October 2012, but it was renamed to its current title in July 2013. It was founded by the former New York Times journalist Thomas Lin, who is the magazine's editor-in-chief. The two deputy editors are John Rennie and Michael Moyer, formerly of Scientific American, and the art director is Samuel Velasco.  

In November 2018, MIT Press published two collections of articles from Quanta Magazine, Alice and Bob Meet the Wall of Fire and The Prime Number Conspiracy.

In May 2022 the magazine's staff, notably Natalie Wolchover, were awarded the Pulitzer Prize for Explanatory Reporting.

References

External links

Quanta Magazine Youtube channel

American science websites
Magazines established in 2012
Online magazines published in the United States
Popular science magazines
Science and technology magazines published in the United States
Pulitzer Prize for Explanatory Journalism winners
2012 establishments in the United States